Zakir Husain Delhi College (formerly known as Zakir Husain College, Anglo Arabic College, and Delhi College), founded in 1696, is the oldest existing educational institution in India, and is a constituent college of the University of Delhi, accredited with NAAC 'A' grade. The college comprises an area of 43 acres. It has had a considerable influence on modern education as well as Urdu and Islamic learning in India, and today remains the only Delhi University college offering BA (Hons) courses in Arabic and Persian.

History

It was initially founded by Ghaziuddin Khan in 1696, a general of Mughal Emperor Aurangzeb, a leading Deccan commander and the father of Qamar-ud-din Khan, Asaf Jah I, the founder of the Asaf Jahi dynasty of Hyderabad, also known as the first Nizam of Hyderabad, in 1690s, and was originally termed Madrasa Ghaziuddin Khan after him. However, with a weakening Mughal Empire, the Madrasa closed between 1790 and 1791, but with the support of local nobility,  an oriental college for literature, science and art, was established at the site in 1792.

It stood just outside the walled city of Delhi outside the Ajmeri Gate, near Paharganj close to the New Delhi railway station. It was originally surrounded by a wall and connected to the walled city fortifications and was referred to as the College Bastion.

It was reorganized as the 'Anglo Arabic College' by the British East India Company in 1828 to provide, in addition to its original objectives, an education in English language and literature. The object was "to uplift" what the Company saw as the "uneducated and half-barbarous people of India." Behind the move was Charles Trevelyan, the brother-in-law of Thomas Babingdon Macaulay, the same infamous Macaulay whose  famously declared that "a single shelf of a good European library was worth the whole native literature of India and Arabia".<No citation provided, this is hearsay.>

Rev. Jennings started secret Bible classes in the officially secular Delhi College. In July 1852, two prominent Delhi Hindus, Dr. Chaman Lal, one of Zafar's personal physicians, and his friend Master Ramchandra, a  mathematics lecturer at the Delhi College, baptised a public ceremony at St. James' Church, Delhi.

Dr. Sprenger, then principal, presided over the founding of the college press, the Matba‘u ’l-‘Ulum and founded the first college periodical, the weekly Qiranu ’s-Sa‘dain, in 1845.

Another cultural intermediatory was Mohan Lal Kashmiri,  diplomat, and author, who worked for the East India Company and was educated at the college.

It was renamed Zakir Husain College in 1975 by Indira Gandhi government after Dr. Zakir Husain, a distinguished educator and a President of India. The college was later shifted to its present building outside Turkman Gate in 1986, the old structure in the Madrasa Ghaziuddin complex,  still houses a hostel for the college. It was declared a heritage monument by the ASI in 2002. Then in 2008, a separate archive on its history was set up within the college library, with centuries-old books and documents on display, chronicling its 300-year-old history.

Governance
Zakir Husain Delhi College is run by the Zakir Husain Memorial Trust since 1975.

Academics

Academic programmes
Zakir Husain Delhi College offers science, humanities and commerce as well as language courses. One important feature of the college is that it is (at least used to be) the only college in Delhi which offers Graduation courses to male students in Psychology. All other  colleges which offer this course are exclusively for female students.

Mirza Mehmood Begg Library and Book Bank
The college has a library possessing about 1,18,462 books. It runs on open shelf system but some important text books are also kept in reserve section. It not only caters to the academic requirements but also houses leisure books and books to increase general awareness. The library is named after the college principal Mirza Mehmood Begg.

Salman Gani Hashmi Auditorium
The college has an auditorium with a seating capacity of 417 persons. Various cultural programmes, lectures and college annual function are also organised in this auditorium. This auditorium is named after the former college principal Salman Gani Hashmi.

College Archives

The Delhi College Archives, situated in a section of the M. M. Begg Library, was inaugurated by Professor Sabyasachi Bhattacharya, chairman, Indian Council of Historical Research, on 18 February 2008.

The archives contain a large number of files relating to the college and significant developments in higher education in Delhi and North India from 1823 onwards. These  have been located within the National Archives of India and the Delhi Archives, and analyzed over the last couples of years.

Original writings by teachers and alumni of the college in Urdu, Persian and English are also available in the archives. Text books prepared and/or used during the 19th Century for instruction in mathematics, history, geography, philosophy, literature etc., are on display. The archives also contains secondary sources and books relating to Delhi College and the intellectual ferment in Delhi region during the 18th and 19th centuries.

Student life

Zakir Husain Memorial Lecture
A major annual event in the college calendar is the Zakir Husain Memorial Lecture to commemorate Dr. Zakir Husain. The speaker is an eminent personality of his field. It is organized in the 1st week of February. Zakir Husain Memorial Lecture is organized since 2006 annually. The lecture has been delivered by the following persons so far:

 Aruna Roy (2006)
Professor Sukhadeo Thorat (2007)
Intizar Hussain (2008)
Hamid Ansari (2009)
Professor B. B. Bhattacharya (2010)
Soli Sorabjee (2011)
Professor C. M. Naim (2012)
Professor V.S. Chauhan (2013)

Convocation Ceremony
This is the only constituent college of the University of Delhi which holds an annual convocation ceremony. Although, due to the ongoing construction of a new building in the college, the college ground remains occupied as a result of which the ceremony wasn't held this year.

Notable people
The notable and alumni and faculty of the college includes.
 Muhammad Qasim Nanautawi, the founding figures of Darul Uloom Deoband,
 Rashid Ahmad Gangohi, the founding figures of Darul Uloom Deoband, 
 Sir Syed Ahmed Khan, the founder of Aligarh Muslim University,
 Deputy Nazir Ahmed, the Urdu essayist and ICS
 Ali Sardar Jafri
 Akhtar ul-Iman
 Ravi Chaturvedi, the first Hindi Cricket commentator he was also a faculty member in zoology department
 Masud Husain Khan,
 J N Dixit, Defence Analyst
 Gopi Chand Narang, Urdu/Persian critic
 Dr. Harsh Vardhan, Incumbent Minister of Ministry of Science & Technology, Ministry of Health and Family Welfare and Ministry of Earth Sciences
 Jagdish Tytler 
 Sikandar Bakht.
 Bhisham Sahni professor of the English department who was a noted writer and dramatist
 Mamluk Ali Nanautawi, the distinguished scholar, who descendants founded Darul Uloom Deoband, served as the Head Teacher of the college. He taught Arabic here in 1830s.
Dr Vikas Divyakirti is an Indian writer, IAS trainer, and lecturer. He is the director and founder of the Drishti IAS

See also
 Mohan Lal Kashmiri
 List of colleges affiliated with the University of Delhi
 Anglo Arabic Senior Secondary School another descendant of the original institution

References

External links
 

1792 establishments in India
Universities and colleges in Delhi
Educational institutions established in 1792
Delhi University